The 2008–09 season was Motherwell's 11th season in the Scottish Premier League, and their 24th consecutive season in the top division of Scottish football. As well as the SPL, the club competed in the Scottish Cup, Scottish League Cup, and the UEFA Cup for the first time in 13 years.

Important Events
 15 August 2008 – The first Scottish Premier League fixture of the season (against Hearts) ends in a 3–2 defeat at Tynecastle.
 29 August 2008 – Draw for the UEFA Cup First round. Motherwell draw French side Nancy.
 1 September 2008 – Draw for the Scottish League Cup third round. Motherwell draw Hamilton (home).
 1 December 2008 – Draw for the Scottish Cup fourth round. Motherwell draw Inverurie (away).
 1 January 2009 – Draw for the Scottish Cup fifth round. Motherwell draw St Mirren (home).
 23 May 2009 – The final Scottish Premier League fixture of the season (against Kilmarnock) ends in a 2–1 defeat at Fir Park.
 26 May 2009 – Motherwell are awarded a place in the Europa League after finishing in the fair play top three, alongside Randers and Rosenborg.
 12 June 2009 – Mark McGhee leaves the club to become manager of Aberdeen. Assistant Scott Leitch and goalkeeping coach Colin Meldrum also leave for the Pittodrie outfit.

Transfers
For a list of Scottish football transfers in 2008–09, see transfers in season 2008–09

Summer Transfer Window (1 July – 1 September 2008)

In Permanent

Loans in

Loans out

Out Permanent

Winter Transfer Window (1 January – 2 February 2009)

In Permanent

Loans in

Loans out

Out Permanent

Motherwell F.C. Season 2008–09 First-team Squad

Updated 5 December 2010

Motherwell F.C. Season 2008–09 Statistics

Appearances
Updated 8 December 2010

|}

2008–09 Motherwell Top scorers

Last updated on 8 December 2010

2008–09 Motherwell Disciplinary Record

Last updated 8 December 2010

2008–09 season

Scottish Premier League

UEFA Cup 2008–09

Scottish Cup 2008–09

Scottish League Cup 2008–09

Overall

SPL

Classification

Results summary

Results by round

Results by opponent

Source: 2008–09 Scottish Premier League article

See also
 List of Motherwell F.C. seasons

References

Motherwell F.C. seasons
Motherwell